Posyolok abonentnogo yaschika 001 is a rural locality (a settlement) in Odintsovo Urban Settlement of Odintsovsky District, Moscow Oblast, Russia. The population was 27 as of 2010.

Geography 
The settlement is located 4 km east of Odintsovo (the district's administrative centre) by road. Glazynino is the nearest rural locality.

References 

Rural localities in Moscow Oblast